The Copeland-Whitfield House is a historic mansion in Pulaski, Tennessee, U.S..

History
The house was built as a log house in the 1830s for Copeland Whitfield, a settler and slaveholder from Virginia. Whitfield lived in the house with his first wife, Susan Harwell, and later with his second wife, Nancy Adell Butler. By 1847, the house was redesigned in the Greek Revival architectural style.

During the American Civil War of 1861–1865, Whitfield was hanged by members of the Union Army, but he survived. After his 1891 death, his widow lived in the house until 1904. Their son, Copeland George Whitfield, lived in the house with his wife, Ella May Cardin, until his death in 1946; his widow lived here until 1980. It was inherited by members of the same family.

The house has been listed on the National Register of Historic Places since July 7, 1988.

References

Houses on the National Register of Historic Places in Tennessee
Greek Revival houses in Tennessee
Houses completed in 1835
Antebellum architecture
Houses in Giles County, Tennessee